Carry Me Home (EP) is the third EP recording by Toronto indie rock band Love Kills. Released May 2007 (independent), the EP's 6 songs are unique in that they are all accompanied by scored cello duets, attempting to mesh with the band's usual fuzz and feedback palette.

Track listing
Suicide - 3:37
Carry Me Home - 3:44
It's Leaving Me Down - 2:41
Now Caroline - 3:40
Let It Roll - 2:28
Give Me Something I Can Love - 4:34
(all songs by Pat Rijd)

Credits
 Heather Flood - vocals, tambourine
 Pat Rijd - guitar, vocals
 Tom Flood - guitar, effects
 Mark Bergshoeff - bass guitar
 Jay Talsma - drums
 Gary Simkins - cello
 Claire Burrows - cello

References

External links
NOW! Magazine Review

Love Kills (band) albums
2007 EPs